Fleet Street is a major street in London, England, famously host to major British newspapers from the 16th to 20th centuries.

Fleet Street may also refer to:

Streets
Fleet Street in Baltimore
Fleet Street, Dublin, Ireland
 Fleet Street in Brooklyn, New York City
 Fleet Street in Kingston, Jamaica, Jamaica
 Fleet Street in Regina, Saskatchewan, Canada
 Fleet Street in Toronto, Ontario, Canada

Arts and media
A popular metonym for the British national press, derived from the London street — see List of newspapers in the United Kingdom
Sweeney Todd, the demon barber of Fleet Street, a story adapted numerous times in film and in theater from 1928–present

Music
The Stanford Fleet Street Singers, a collegiate comedy a cappella group from Stanford, CA
Fleet Street (album) (2004), the first entirely-original collegiate a cappella album and the 11th studio album by the Stanford Fleet Street Singers.

Television
Fleet Street, the working title of the '00s American legal drama eventually produced as Boston Legal
"Fleet Street Goodies", an episode of the 1970s British TV show The Goodies

Other
Fleet Street Publisher
Fleet Street Pumping Station, in Ottawa, Ontario
Queen's Wharf Lighthouse, also known as the "Fleet Street Lighthouse", on Fleet Street in Toronto, Ontario
Fleet Street, A competitor who failed to complete the 2009 Grand National